Cherhill is a hamlet in Alberta, Canada within Lac Ste. Anne County.

The hamlet is located in census division No. 13.

The first syllable of the Cherhill's name is derived from the last syllable of the name of A. P. Stetcher, an early postmaster, with "hill" added to it.

Demographics 
The population of Cherhill according to the 2008 municipal census conducted by Lac Ste. Anne County is 60.

See also 
List of communities in Alberta
List of hamlets in Alberta
Cherhill, Wiltshire, England

References 

Hamlets in Alberta
Lac Ste. Anne County